Vicente Viegas (born 13th century) was a Portuguese nobleman, Lord of Couto de Leomil (pt), in the Kingdom of Portugal.

His parents were Egas Garcia da Fonseca, 2nd Lord of Couto de Leomil and Maior Pais Romeu. His wife was Sancha.

References 

13th-century Portuguese people
Portuguese nobility
Portuguese Roman Catholics